Tan Kah Kee (21 October 1874 – 12 August 1961) was a Chinese businessman, investor, and philanthropist active in Singapore and the Chinese cities of Hong Kong, Shanghai, Xiamen, and Guangzhou.

A prominent figure in the overseas Chinese community in Singapore and wider Southeast Asia during the 20th century, he was responsible for gathering much support from the community to aid China in major events such as the Xinhai Revolution (1911), the Kuomintang's Northern Expedition (1926–28), and the Second Sino-Japanese War (1937–45).

Apart from donating most of his assets and earnings to aid China in those major events, Tan set up funds in Southeast Asia and Hong Kong and contributed to the establishment of several schools in Southeast Asia and China's Fujian Province, including Xiamen University.

Life
Tan Kah Kee was born in Xiamen, Fujian Province, in 1874 during the Qing dynasty of China. In 1890, at the age of 16, he travelled to Singapore in the Straits Settlements to help his father, who owned a rice trading business. In 1903, after his father's business collapsed, Tan started his own company and built a business empire from rubber plantations, manufacturing, sawmills, canneries, real estate, import and export brokerage, ocean transport and rice trading. As he was proficient in Hokkien, he achieved much success doing business in Singapore because Hokkien was the lingua franca of overseas Chinese in Singapore throughout most of the 19th and 20th centuries. His business was at its prime from 1912 to 1914 when he was known as the "Henry Ford of the Malayan community".

Tan had a leading role among the 110 founders of Tao Nan School in Singapore. In 1919, he set up The Chinese High School (now Hwa Chong Institution) in Singapore. Earlier, in 1918, he established the Jimei Schools (now Jimei University) in Xiamen. Tan was also a member of the Anglo-Chinese College Council and had pledged S$100,000 to the proposed Anglo Chinese School College in 1919. However, when the proposal was turned down by the Government, he agreed to channel the $30,000 he had given to the Anglo-Chinese School fund for physics and chemistry. This helped to complete the Secondary School at Cairnhill in 1928. In 1921, he set up Xiamen University and financially supported it until the Nationalist government of the Republic of China took over in 1937. In 1920, Tan arranged a marriage between his daughter, Tan Ai Leh, and Lee Kong Chian, his protégé and a businessman.

Tan was one of the prominent overseas Chinese to provide financial support to China during the Second Sino-Japanese War. He organised many relief funds under his name, one of which alone managed to raise ten million Straits dollars in 1937. He was also a participant in the Legislative Yuan of the Nationalist government in Chongqing. After the Japanese invaded and occupied Malaya and Singapore in 1942, they deemed these contributors "undesirable" and conducted systematic extermination of anti-Japanese elements in Singapore through the Sook Ching Massacre. Tan survived because he escaped from Singapore before it fell to the Japanese, and went into hiding in Malang, a town in East Java province, Indonesia. He strongly rejected proposals to attempt to negotiate with the Japanese and regarded such attempts as characteristic of a hanjian (a Chinese term for race traitor). He also attempted to dissuade Wang Jingwei from such activities. He exercised considerable effort against the governor of Fujian Province, Chen Yi, for perceived maladministration.

In 1943, while he was in Java, Tan began writing his memoirs, The Memoirs of an Overseas Chinese of the Southern Ocean, which later became an important document of the history of the overseas Chinese in Southeast Asia.

Tan was the de facto leader of the Chinese community in Singapore, serving as chairman of the Chinese Chamber of Commerce and helping to organise the Hokkien clan association. However, he lost this role when the Chinese Civil War divided Singapore's Chinese community into Communist and Kuomintang sympathisers. Tan was a Communist supporter due to the corruption within the Kuomintang. 

In 1947 Tan founded the Chiyu Banking Corporation in Hong Kong, an intended to be a sustainable business with profits to be devoted to education in Xiamen and the rest of Fujian province in China.

After the Communist victory in China and the founding of the People's Republic of China in 1949, Tan tried to return to Singapore in 1950 but was denied entry by the British colonial authorities concerned about communist influence in Singapore and Malaya. He then moved permanently to China and served in numerous positions in the Chinese Communist Party.

Tan died in 1961 in Beijing and was given a state funeral by the Chinese government. In Singapore, the Tan Kah Kee Scholarship Fund, which later became known as the Tan Kah Kee Foundation, was established in memory of this philanthropy.

Personal life
Tan's sons were:
 Tan Chay Bing, Tan Khuat Siong, Tan Pok Ai, Tan Pok Chay, Tan Kok Kheng, Tan Guan Khai, Tan Guan Chay, Tan Kok Whye and Tan Guan Aik

Tan's daughters were:
 Tan Ai Leh, Tan Lay Ho, Tan Ah Hui, Tan Mary, Tan Lay Choo, Tan Poh Tee and Tan Ai Eng

Many of his children maintained close relationship with or even married other prominent Chinese figures in Singapore. For example, Tan Ai Leh, his eldest daughter, was married to Lee Kong Chian; Tan Lay Ho was married to Lim Chong Kuo, the eldest son of respected merchant Lim Nee Soon.

Legacy
In recognition of Tan's contributions to education and society throughout his lifetime, there are places and establishments in China and Southeast Asia named after Tan or built to commemorate him, including: the Tan Kah Kee Memorial Museum in Tan's hometown in Jimei; the Tan Kah Kee Foundation, which offers postgraduate scholarships; the Tan Kah Kee MRT station along the Downtown MRT line in Singapore, next to the current site of Hwa Chong Institution. The schools in the Anglo-Chinese School family have houses named after Tan. Chongfu School's Main Hall is named after him. Tan Kah Kee Hall at the University of California, Berkeley, is also named after him.

The asteroid 2963 Chen Jiageng is named after him.

Image gallery

See also
 Tan Kah Kee MRT station, a train station in Singapore named after Tan Kah Kee
 Lee Kong Chian, Tan Kah Kee's son-in-law, who was also a businessman

References

Footnotes

General references

External links

 Tan Kah Kee Biography & Photo Album
 Tan Kah Kee Foundation Homepage.

1874 births
1961 deaths
Businesspeople from Fujian
Hokkien businesspeople
Singaporean chief executives
Singaporean investors
Singaporean people of Hokkien descent
Singaporean people of World War II
Singaporean philanthropists
Vice Chairpersons of the National Committee of the Chinese People's Political Consultative Conference
People's Republic of China politicians from Fujian
Politicians from Xiamen
World War II resistance members